Egertorget  is a pedestrian mall located at the intersection of Karl Johans gate and  Øvre Slottsgate  in Oslo, Norway.

History
Egertorget is a  square which arose around 1840 where Karl Johans gate and Øvre slottsgate  crossed each other alongside Stabellkroken.
Both Stabellgården and Egergården were torn down in order to tie the streets together. The square derived it name from brothers Herman Eger (1816-1883) and Thorvald Eger (1827-1901), brewers who had owned the displaced Egergården.

Egertorget  has one of the entrances to Stortinget Station of the Oslo Metro.  Egertorget square is a retail   shopping area. Many outdoor cafes wreathe the square, with Presseklubben and 3 brødre being the most well-known. In summer, Egertorget is also home to many street musicians and jugglers.

Gallery

References

External links
Karl Johans gate ved Egertorget    (digitaltmuseum.no)

Squares in Oslo
Pedestrian malls
Shopping districts and streets